The 2015 Florida State Seminoles baseball team represented Florida State University during the 2015 NCAA Division I baseball season. The Seminoles played their home games at Mike Martin Field at Dick Howser Stadium as a member of the Atlantic Coast Conference. They were led by head coach Mike Martin, in his 36th season at Florida State. It was the Seminoles' 24th season as a member of the ACC and its 10th in the ACC's Atlantic Division.

Despite having a young team, Florida State won the ACC title and reached forty wins for the thirty-eighth straight year. The Seminoles were selected to host a regional in the NCAA Tournament, marking their fifty-third tournament appearance and hosting for the thirty-second time, advancing to the super regionals for the fourteenth time.

Previous season

In 2014, the Seminoles finished the season as Atlantic division champions with a record of 43–17, 21–9 in conference play. They qualified for the ACC Tournament and were eliminated in pool play. The Seminoles qualified for the NCAA Tournament as the #5 overall national seed. They were hosts of the Tallahassee regional, which also contained Georgia Southern, Alabama, and Kennesaw State. Florida State was upset by both Georgia Southern and Alabama and was eliminated after just two games.

Personnel

Roster

Coaching staff

Season

Preseason
In the ACC Media Poll, Florida State was picked by the coaches to finish second in the conference and first in the Atlantic Division.

Schedule
Florida State was selected to be a regional host in the NCAA tournament as the thirteenth overall seed.

! colspan=2 style="" | Regular Season 
|- valign="top" 

|- align="center" bgcolor="#bbffbb"
| February 13 ||  || #11 || Dick Howser Stadium • Tallahassee, FL || W 7–3 || Holtmann (1–0) || Scocchia (0–1) ||  || 4,712 || 1–0 || –
|- align="center" bgcolor="#bbffbb"
| February 14 || Oakland || #11 || Dick Howser Stadium • Tallahassee, FL || W 15–2 || Biegalski (1–0) || Gee (0–1) ||  || 5,431 || 2–0 || –
|- align="center" bgcolor="#bbffbb"
| February 15 || Oakland || #11 || Dick Howser Stadium • Tallahassee, FL || W 5–1 || Johnson (1–0)  || Morton (0–1) ||  || 4,254 || 3–0 || –
|- align="center" bgcolor="#ffbbb"
| February 18 || at  || #11 || John Sessions Stadium • Jacksonville, FL || L 3–5 || Tanner (1–0)  || Holtmann (1–1) || Disch (1) || 1,878 || 3–1 || –
|- align="center" bgcolor="#bbffbb"
| February 20 || at  || #11 || Foley Field • Athens, GA || W 7–5 || Folsom (1–0) || McLaughlin (0–1) || Strode (1) || 1,821 || 4–1 || –
|- align="center" bgcolor="#ffbbb"
| February 21 || at Georgia || #11 || Foley Field • Athens, GA || L 1–4 || Lawlor (2–0) || Biegalski (1–1) || Cheek (1) || 2,826 || 4–2 || –
|- align="center" bgcolor="#ffbbb"
| February 21 || at Georgia || #11 || Foley Field • Athens, GA || L 5–10 || Sosebee (2–0) || Johnson (1–1) ||  || 2,826 || 4–3 || –
|- align="center" bgcolor="#bbffbb"
| February 24 || Jacksonville || #22 || Dick Howser Stadium • Tallahassee, FL || W 10–7 || Silva (1–0) || Baker (0–2) || Strode (2) || 3,669 || 5–3 || –
|- align="center" bgcolor="#bbffbb"
| February 27 ||  || #22 || Dick Howser Stadium • Tallahassee, FL || W 4–3 || Byrd (1–0) || Magestro (1–1) || Strode (3) || 4,155 || 6–3 || –
|- align="center" bgcolor="#bbffbb"
| February 28 || UNC Wilmington || #22 || Dick Howser Stadium • Tallahassee, FL || W 5–3 || Silva (2–0) || Ramsey (0–1) || Strode (4) || 3,949 || 7–3 || –
|-

|- align="center" bgcolor="#bbffbb"
| March 1 || UNC Wilmington || #22 || Dick Howser Stadium • Tallahassee, FL || W 9–8 || Folsom (2–0) || Gantz (1–1) || Strode (5) || 3,904 || 8–3 || –
|- align="center" bgcolor="#bbffbb"
| March 3 || South Florida || #22 || Dick Howser Stadium • Tallahassee, FL || W 24–1 || Carlton (1–0) || Lawson (0–1) ||  || 3,944 || 9–3 || –
|- align="center" bgcolor="#bbffbb"
| March 4 || South Florida || #22 || Dick Howser Stadium • Tallahassee, FL || W 7–3 || Byrd (2–0) || Eveld (0–1) || Folsom (1) || 3,900 || 10–3 || –
|- align="center" bgcolor="#bbffbb"
|  March 6 || Boston College || #22 || Dick Howser Stadium • Tallahassee, FL || W 7–0 || Compton (1–0) || Burke (0–3) ||  || 3,777 || 11–3 || 1–0
|- align="center" bgcolor="#bbffbb"
| March 7 || Boston College || #22 || Dick Howser Stadium • Tallahassee, FL || W 3–2 || Holtmann (2–1) || King (0–1) || Strode (6) || 4,448 || 12–3 || 2–0
|- align="center" bgcolor="#bbffbb"
| March 8 || Boston College || #22 || Dick Howser Stadium • Tallahassee, FL || W 8–4 || Johnson (2–1) || Dunn (2–1) ||  || 4,207 || 13–3 || 3–0
|- align="center" bgcolor="#bbffbb"
| March 10 || #9 UCF || #11 || Dick Howser Stadium • Tallahassee, FL || W 11–8 || Byrd (3–0) || Marsh (0–1) || Strode (7) || 3,980 || 14–3 || –
|- align="center" bgcolor="#bbffbb"
| March 11 || #9 UCF || #11 || Dick Howser Stadium • Tallahassee, FL || W 15–11 || Deise (1–0) || Thompson (0–2) ||  || 3,728 || 15–3 || –
|- align="center" bgcolor="#ffbbb"
| March 13 || Wake Forest || #11 || Dick Howser Stadium • Tallahassee, FL || L 1–4 || Pirro (5–0) || Voyles (0–1) || Dunshee (1) || 3,870 || 15–4 || 3–1
|- align="center" bgcolor="#bbffbb"
| March 14 || Wake Forest || #11 || Dick Howser Stadium • Tallahassee, FL || W 12–2 || Biegalski (2–1) || Johnstone (1–1) ||  || 4,286 || 16–4 || 4–1
|- align="center" bgcolor="#bbffbb"
| March 15 || Wake Forest || #11 || Dick Howser Stadium • Tallahassee, FL || W 9–6 || Holtmann (3–1) || Kirkpatrick (2–1) ||  || 4,151 || 17–4 || 5–1
|- align="center" bgcolor="#ffbbb"
| March 17 || at #4 Florida || #7 || Alfred A. McKethan Stadium • Gainesville, FL || L 8–14 || Vinson (2–0) || Carlton (1–1) ||  || 5,827 || 17–5 || –
|- align="center" bgcolor="#ffbbb"
| March 20 || at #12 Virginia || #7 || Davenport Field • Charlottesville, VA || L 4–8 || Doherty (1–0) || Silva (2–1) || Sborz (5) || 3,200 || 17–6 || 5–2
|- align="center" bgcolor="#bbffbb"
| March 21 || at #12 Virginia ||  #7|| Davenport Field • Charlottesville, VA || W 12–10 || Silva (3–1) || Sborz (1–2) ||  || 4,196 || 18–6 || 6–2
|- align="center" bgcolor="#bbffbb"
| March 22 || at #12 Virginia || #7 || Davenport Field • Charlottesville, VA || W 13–1 || Johnson (3–1) || Waddell (1–1) ||  || 3,994 || 19–6 || 7–2
|- align="center" bgcolor="#bbffbb"
| March 25 || Alabama State || #7 || Dick Howser Stadium • Tallahassee, FL || W 8–7 || Silva (4–1) || Pantoja (0–2) || Strode (8) || 4,116 || 20–6 || –
|- align="center" bgcolor="#ffbbb"
| March 27 || Virginia Tech || #7 || Dick Howser Stadium • Tallahassee, FL || L 3–8 || Keselica (4–1) || Biegalski (2–2) ||  || 4,253 || 20–7 || 7–3
|- align="center" bgcolor="#bbffbb"
| March 28 || Virginia Tech || #7 || Dick Howser Stadium • Tallahassee, FL || W 19–9 || Silva (5–1) || McGarity (2–3) ||  || 6,348 || 21–7 || 8–3
|- align="center" bgcolor="#bbffbb"
| March 29 || Virginia Tech || #7 || Dick Howser Stadium • Tallahassee, FL || W 6–5 || Strode (1–0) || Scherzer (1–2) ||  || 4,358 || 22–7 || 9–3
|- align="center" bgcolor="#bbffbb"
| March 31 || vs. #6 Florida || #8 || Baseball Grounds • Jacksonville, FL || W 8–3 || Holtmann (4–1) || Faedo (1–1) || Silva (1) || 8,306 || 23–7 || –
|-

|- align="center" bgcolor="#bbffbb"
| April 2 || at NC State || #8 || Doak Field • Raleigh, NC || W 3–2 || Byrd (4–0) || O'Donnell (1–1) || Strode (9) || 1,528 || 24–7 || 10–3
|- align="center" bgcolor="#bbffbb"
| April 3 || at NC State || #8 || Doak Field • Raleigh, NC || W 1–0 || Carlton (2–1) || Brown (3–2) || Strode (10) || 2,201 || 25–7 || 11–3
|- align="center" bgcolor="#ffbbb"
| April 4 || at NC State || #8 || Doak Field • Raleigh, NC || L 7–11 || O'Donnell (4–1) || Johnson (3–2) || Gilbert (1) || 1,838 || 25–8 || 11–4
|- align="center" bgcolor="#bbffbb"
| April 7 ||  || #7 || Dick Howser Stadium • Tallahassee, FL || W 5–0 || Holtmann (5–1) || Smeltzer (1–3) ||  || 4,032 || 26–8 || –
|- align="center" bgcolor="#ffbbb"
| April 8 || Florida Gulf Coast || #7 || Dick Howser Stadium • Tallahassee, FL || L 0–5 || Deckert (1–0) || Voyles (0–1) ||  || 3,815 || 26–9 || –
|- align="center" bgcolor="#ffbbb"
| April 10 || at Notre Dame || #7 || Frank Eck Stadium • Notre Dame, IN || L 2–5 || Smoyer (5–0) || Biegalski (2–3) || Guenther (2) || 522 || 26–10 || 11–5
|- align="center" bgcolor="#ffbbb"
| April 11 || at Notre Dame || #7 || Frank Eck Stadium • Notre Dame, IN || L 1–4 || Bielak (4–1) || Carlton (2–2) || Guenther (3) || 1,109 || 26–11 || 11–6
|- align="center" bgcolor="#ffbbb"
| April 12 || at Notre Dame || #7 || Frank Eck Stadium • Notre Dame, IN || L 1–2 || Hale (1–0) || Compton (1–1) || Tully (1) || 896 || 26–12 || 11–7
|- align="center" bgcolor="#bbffbb"
| April 14 || #12 Florida || #9 || Dick Howser Stadium • Tallahassee, FL || W 4–312 || Strode (2–0) || Rubio (0–1) ||  || 6,634 || 27–12 || –
|- align="center" bgcolor="#bbffbb"
| April 17 || Pittsburgh || #9 || Dick Howser Stadium • Tallahassee, FL || W 15–2 || Biegalski (3–3) || Zeuch (3–5) ||  || 3,986 || 28–12 || 12–7
|- align="center" bgcolor="#bbffbb"
| April 18 || Pittsburgh || #9 || Dick Howser Stadium • Tallahassee, FL || W 6–5 || Byrd (5–0) || Mitchell (0–2) || Stode (11) || 5,296 || 29–12 || 13–7
|- align="center" bgcolor="#bbffbb"
| April 18 || Pittsburgh || #9 || Dick Howser Stadium • Tallahassee, FL || W 10–6 || Carlton (3–2) || Berube (1–5) ||  || 5,296 || 30–12 || 14–7
|- align="center" bgcolor="#bbffbb"
| April 21 ||  || #8 || Dick Howser Stadium • Tallahassee, FL || W 6–1 || Silva (6–1) || Thorne (3–1) ||  || 4,079 || 31–12 || –
|- align="center" bgcolor="#bbffbb"
| April 24 || at #6 Miami (FL) || #8 || Alex Rodriguez Park • Coral Gables, FL || W 8–717 || Zirzow (1–0) || Beauprez (1–2) ||  || 4,189 || 32–12 || 15–7
|- align="center" bgcolor="#bbffbb"
| April 25 || at #6 Miami (FL) || #8 || Alex Rodriguez Park • Coral Gables, FL || W 15–5 || Compton (2–1) || Suarez (4–1) ||  || 4,650 || 33–12 || 16–7
|- align="center" bgcolor="#ffbbb"
| April 26 || at #6 Miami (FL) || #8 || Alex Rodriguez Park • Coral Gables, FL || L 0–12 || Sosa (6–3) || Carlton (3–3) ||  || 3,289 || 33–13 || 16–8
|-

|- align="center" bgcolor="#bbffbb"
| May 1 ||  || #7 || Dick Howser Stadium • Tallahassee, FL || W 16–2 || Biegalski (4–3) || Morrison (2–2) ||  || 3,979 || 34–13 || –
|- align="center" bgcolor="#bbffbb"
| May 2 || Coastal Carolina || #7 || Dick Howser Stadium • Tallahassee, FL || W 8–3 || Compton (3–1) || Kerr (8–1) ||  || 4,211 || 35–13 || –
|- align="center" bgcolor="#ffbbb"
| May 3 || Coastal Carolina || #7 || Dick Howser Stadium • Tallahassee, FL || L 2–4 || Holmes (4–0) || Carlton (3–4) ||  || 3,978 || 35–14 || –
|- align="center" bgcolor="#bbffbb"
| May 5 || at Stetson || #7 || Melching Field • DeLand, FL || W 3–1 || Holtmann (6–1) || Fagan (1–1) || Strode (12) || 1,874 || 36–14 || –
|- align="center" bgcolor="#bbffbb"
| May 8 || at #4 Louisville || #7 || Jim Patterson Stadium • Louisville, KY || W 13–4 || Biegalski (5–3) || Funkhouser (6–4) ||  || 6,138 || 37–14 || 17–8
|- align="center" bgcolor="#ffbbb"
| May 9 || at #4 Louisville || #7 || Jim Patterson Stadium • Louisville, KY || L 0–7 || McKay (8–1) || Compton (3–2) ||  || 3,054 || 37–15 || 17–9
|- align="center" bgcolor="#ffbbb"
| May 10 || at #4 Louisville || #7 || Jim Patterson Stadium • Louisville, KY || L5–6 || Burdi (4–0) || Byrd (5–1) ||  || 3,302 || 37–16 || 17–10
|- align="center" bgcolor="#ffbbb"
| May 14 || Clemson || #8 || Dick Howser Stadium • Tallahassee, FL || L 1–4 || Crownover (10–1) || Biegalski (5–4) || Krall (3) || 4,082 || 37–17 || 17–11
|- align="center" bgcolor="#ffbbb"
| May 15 || Clemson || #8 || Dick Howser Stadium • Tallahassee, FL || L 0–7 || Erwin (6–4) || Compton (3–3) || Vetzel (4) || 4,492 || 37–18 || 17–12
|- align="center" bgcolor="#ffbbb"
| May 16 || Clemson || #8 || Dick Howser Stadium • Tallahassee, FL || L 6–9 || Long (2–0) || Carlton (3–5) ||  || 4,541 || 37–19 || 17–13
|-

|-
! style="" | Post-Season 
|- 

|- align="center" bgcolor="#bbffbb"
| May 20 || vs. #28 (5) Clemson || #10 (4) || Durham Bulls Athletic Park • Durham, NC(Pool A) || W 3–1 || Biegalski (6–4) || Crownover (10–2) || Strode (13) || 3,155 || 38–19 || 1–0
|- align="center" bgcolor="#bbffbb"
| May 21 || vs. (8) North Carolina || #10 (4) || Durham Bulls Athletic Park • Durham, NC(Pool A) || W 8–4 || Compton (4–3) || Thornton (3–7) ||  || 3,291 || 39–19 || 2–0
|- align="center" bgcolor="#bbffbb"
| May 23 || vs. #5 (1) Louisville || #10 (4) || Durham Bulls Athletic Park • Durham, NC(Pool A) || W 6–0 || Carlton (4–5) || McKay (8–3) ||  || 4,179 || 40–19 || 3–0
|- align="center" bgcolor="#bbffbb"
| May 24 || vs. (6) NC State || #10 (4) || Durham Bulls Athletic Park • Durham, NC(Championship) || W 6–2 || Biegalski (7–4) || Piedmonte (1–1) ||  || 9,759 || 41–19 || 4–0
|-

|-
! style="" | NCAA Tournament 
|- 

|- align="center" bgcolor="#bbffbb"
| May 29 || (4) Mercer || #10 (1) || Dick Howser Stadium • Tallahassee, FL || W 5–410 || Strode (3–0) || Kourtis (3–2) ||  || 3,824 || 42–19 || 1–0
|- align="center" bgcolor="#bbffbb"
| May 30 || #25 (2) College of Charleston || #10 (1) || Dick Howser Stadium • Tallahassee, FL || W 3–2 || Silva (7–1) || Glazer (10–2) || Strode (14) || 3,562 || 43–19 || 2–0 
|- align="center" bgcolor="#bbffbb"
| June 1 || #25 (2) College of Charleston || #10 (1) || Dick Howser Stadium • Tallahassee, FL || W 8–1 || Carlton (5–5) || McCutcheon (1–2) ||  || 3,037 || 44–19 || 3–0 
|-

|- align="center" bgcolor="#ffbbb"
| June 5 || at #6 (4) Florida || #9 (13) || Alfred A. McKethan Stadium • Gainesville, FL || L 5–13 || Shore (9–6) || Biegalski (7–5) ||  || 5,709 || 44–20 || 0–1  
|- align="center" bgcolor="#ffbbb"
| June 6 || at #6 (4) Florida || #9 (13) || Alfred A. McKethan Stadium • Gainesville, FL || L 4–11 || Poyner (5–2) || Compton (4–4) ||  || 5,772 || 44–21 || 0–2
|-

|-
| Legend:       = Win       = Loss       = PostponementBold = Florida State team member
|-
|Rankings from Collegiate Baseball; parenthesis indicate tournament seedings.
|-

Rankings

Awards
D. J. Stewart
 Louisville Slugger Pre-season First Team All-American
 Perfect Game USA Pre-season First Team All-American
 Baseball America Pre-season First Team All-American
 D1Baseball.com Pre-season First Team All-American
 NCBWA Pre-season First Team All-American
 Golden Spikes Semifinalist

Watchlists
 Golden Spikes Award
D. J. Stewart
 NCBWA Stopper of the Year Award
Billy Strode

Honors
ACC Player of the Week
D. J. Stewart
Chris Marconcini
ACC Pitcher of the Week
Billy Strode
Boomer Biegalski
NCBWA Hitter of the Week
D. J. Stewart
National Player of the Week (Louisville Slugger/Collegiate Baseball)
D. J. Stewart
Chris Marconcini
Boomer Biegalski

All-ACC
Four players were named All-ACC selections.
First Team
D. J. Stewart
Second Team
Billy Strode
Third Team
Quincy Nieporte
Freshman Team
Dylan Busby
Ben Duluzio, Chris Marconcini and Boomer Biegalski were named to the All-Tournament team, with Boomer Biegalski being named tournament MVP.

All-Americans
Dylan Busby
D. J. Stewart
Billy Strode

MLB Draft
Seven players were selected in the 2015 MLB Draft:

References

External links
 Official website
 Media Guide
 Broadcast schedule

Florida State Seminoles
Florida State Seminoles baseball seasons
Florida State
2015